This is a list of show mines, that are currently open to the public. Focus is on underground mining activity.

Argentina

Australia

Austria

Belgium

Bolivia

Brazil

Bulgaria

Canada

Colombia

Croatia

Czech Republic

Denmark

Germany

Finland

France

Greece

Indonesia

Ireland

Italy

Japan

Luxembourg

Mexico

New Zealand

Netherlands

Norway

Pakistan

Poland

Portugal

Republic of China, Taiwan

Romania

Slovakia

Slovenia

South Korea

Spain

Sweden

Switzerland

Ukraine

United Kingdom

United States

External links (sources)

References

s

Mining museums